Oliver Gwilt (born 28 June 1993) is a Welsh male badminton player.

Achievements

BWF International Challenge/Series
Men's Doubles

Mixed Doubles

 BWF International Challenge tournament
 BWF International Series tournament
 BWF Future Series tournament

References

External links
 
 

1993 births
Living people
Sportspeople from Shrewsbury
Welsh male badminton players
Commonwealth Games competitors for Wales
Badminton players at the 2014 Commonwealth Games